Crimini bianchi is an Italian television series.

See also
List of Italian television series

External links
 

2008 Italian television series debuts
2009 Italian television series endings
2000s Italian drama television series
Italian medical television series
Canale 5 original programming
Italia 1 original programming